Idukki is a township in Idukki district near to the district headquarter Painavu in the state of Kerala, southern India. The township consists of the towns of Cheruthoni, Painavu (district capital), Thadiyampadu, Idukki proper and Vazhathope. Idukki town is an administrative town but the district headquarters is located at Painavu.

The town is also a tourist spot with Idukki dam, Asia's largest Arch dam and Cheruthony dam, Kerala's biggest dam. River Periyar flows through the heart of the town.

Nearby places  
 Towns
 Kattappana
 Thodupuzha
Nedumkandam
 Adimali
Thopramkudy
Cheruthoni
Painavu
Thankamani
Moolamattom
Rajamudy

Population 
 Demographics - According to the census data of 2001, Idukki Township has a population of 11,347 in which 5925 are men and 5422 are woman.
 The town has 98.26% literacy.
 Religion - Its Saint George’s Cathedral is the episcopal see of the Syro-Malabar Catholic Eparchy of Idukki (an Eastern Catholic diocese, Chaldean = Syro-Oriental rite).

Politics 
Idukki Town is a part of Idukki (State Assembly constituency) and of India's federal Idukki (Lok Sabha constituency).

References

Sources and external links 
 GCatholic - St George’s Cathedral, Syro-Malabar Diocese of Idukki

Cities and towns in Idukki district